Ma Thudamasari is a 1994 Burmese drama film, directed by Kyi Soe Tun starring Kyaw Ye Aung, Moht Moht Myint Aung, Zaw Lin, Myint Myint Khine, San San Aye and Khin Soe Paing. It was based on the popular novel Ma Thudamasari written by Moe Moe (Inya).

Cast
Moht Moht Myint Aung as Ma Thudamasari, Thein Mya
Myint Myint Khine as Ngwe Hmone, mother of Ma Thudamasari
Zaw Lin as Thaung Phay
Kyaw Ye Aung as Hla Khine
San San Aye as Shwe Hmone, aunt of Ma Thudamasari
Khin Soe Paing as Htway Sein

Awards

References

1994 films
1990s Burmese-language films
Burmese drama films
Films shot in Myanmar
1994 drama films